William Harrison "Bones" Dillard (July 8, 1923 – November 15, 2019) was an American track and field athlete, who is the only male in the history of the Olympic Games to win gold in both the 100 meter (sprints) and the 110 meter hurdles, making him the “World’s Fastest Man” in 1948 and the “World’s Fastest Hurdler” in 1952.

Early life and career
Dillard was born in Cleveland, Ohio on July 8, 1923 and attended East Technical High School. He entered Baldwin-Wallace College in 1941 and joined Pi Lambda Phi International Fraternity, and two years later was drafted into the U.S. Army serving in the all-black 92nd Infantry Division known as the Buffalo Soldiers. He returned to college in 1946 and resumed athletics, inspired by Jesse Owens, who, like him, was from Cleveland and had attended East Technical High School. He won the NCAA and AAU 120-yard and 220-yard hurdles in both 1946 and 1947 and he tied world records in both events with a 22.3 in the 220 in 1946 and a 13.6 in the 120. Between June 1947 and June 1948 he remained unbeaten in 82 consecutive finals, a record until broken by Ed Moses.

Olympic Games

At the trials for the 1948 Summer Olympics, Dillard failed to qualify for the 110 m hurdles event, but qualified for the 100 m after finishing third.

At the Games, Dillard reached the final, which seemed to end in a dead heat between Dillard and another American, Barney Ewell.  The finish photo showed Dillard had won, equalling the World record as well. This was the first use of a photo finish at an Olympic Games. As a member of the 4 × 100 m relay team, he won another gold medal at the London Games.

Four years later, still a strong hurdler, Dillard did qualify for the 110 m hurdles event, and won the event in Helsinki.  Another 4 × 100 m relay victory yielded Dillard's fourth Olympic title. Dillard attempted to qualify for a third Olympics in 1956, but failed (finishing seventh in the trials final ). Earlier he took part in and won the gold medal in the 110m hurdles at the 1953 Maccabiah Games.

Later years
Dillard worked for the Cleveland Indians baseball franchise in scouting and public relations capacities, and hosted a radio talk show on Cleveland's WERE. He also worked for the Cleveland City School District for many years as its Business Manager. Dillard died on November 15, 2019, at the age of 96 of stomach cancer.  At the time of his death he was the United States' oldest living Olympic gold medallist.

Competition record

Awards and honors
 Four-time Olympic Gold Medalist
 U.S. Olympic Hall of Fame inductee
 James E. Sullivan Award winner, in 1955
 Statue at Baldwin Wallace University
 Track at Baldwin Wallace named the Harrison Dillard Track
 United States National Track and Field Hall of Fame inductee in 1974 (the inaugural year)
 IAAF Hall of Fame inductee, in 2013.

World Rankings 

Dillard was ranked among the best in the world in both the 100 m/100 y sprint and 110 m/120 y sprint hurdle events from 1947 to 1953, according to the votes of the experts of Track and Field News.

World Records 

Dillard in his career posted the following world record and world best times.

Dillard achieved the following world records during his track career:

 120 y (110 m) hurdles of 13.6 s in Lawrence at the Kansas Relays on 17 April 1948;
 220 y hurdles (straight course) of 22.5s in Delaware on 8 June 1946;
 220 y hurdles (straight course) of  22.3 s in Salt Lake City on 21 June 1947.

He also ran the following world best times that were never ratified by the sport's governing body, the IAAF:
 220 y hurdles (turn) of 23.0 in Minneapolis on 22 June 1946;
 220 y hurdles (straight course) of  22.5 s in Berea, Ohio on 20 May 1947.

Notes

References

Further reading

External links

 Interview with Harrison Dillard, recorded September 13, 2012, at Cleveland Public Library's Sports Research Center.
 Harrison Dillard 100m win at 1948 Olympics (video)
 Encyclopedia of Baldwin Wallace University History: Harrison Dillard
 
 
 
 

1923 births
2019 deaths
African-American male track and field athletes
United States Army personnel of World War II
American male hurdlers
American male sprinters
Athletes (track and field) at the 1948 Summer Olympics
Athletes (track and field) at the 1952 Summer Olympics
Baldwin Wallace University alumni
Deaths from cancer in Ohio
Deaths from stomach cancer
James E. Sullivan Award recipients
Maccabiah Games medalists in athletics
Medalists at the 1948 Summer Olympics
Medalists at the 1952 Summer Olympics
Military personnel from Cleveland
Olympic gold medalists for the United States in track and field
Track and field athletes from Cleveland
Buffalo Soldiers